El Reemplazante is a Chilean TV series originally broadcast on Televisión Nacional de Chile. The show follows a man, ousted from his previous financial career, who becomes a substitute math teacher at a low income school in Santiago. The plot was partially motivated by the Chilean student protests in 2011. Production was partially funded by the Consejo Nacional de Televisión de Chile. The showrunner was Hernan Rodriguez Matte. At the 2013 Altazor Awards, the show won awards for best direction, best screenplay, and best actor.

Main cast
 Ivan Alvarez de Araya as Carlos "Charlie" Valdivia (1-2)
 Blanca Lewin as Ana (1-2)
 Karla Melo as Flavia (1-2)
 Sebastian Ayala as Maicol (1-2)
 Roberto Farias as Francisco "Pancho" Valdivia (1-2)
 Sergio Hernandez as Dionisio Valdivia (1-2)
 Gaston Salgado as Claudio (1-2)
 Trinidad Gonzales as Nieves Mondaca (2)
 Valentina Muhr as Isabel Mellado (2)
 Maria Jose Illanes as Lucia (2)
Rafael De La Reguera as Gerardo Munizaga (2)
Rocio Monasterio as Kathy (1-2)

Recurring cast
 Cristian Soto as Andres Rodriguez / Zafrada
 Pablo Rojas as Ariel
 Paula Aguilera as Nicole 
Monica Huenten as Jenny
 Jaime Azocar as Raul Jorquera
 Gonzalo Canelo as Hamster
 Maite Neira as Toya
 Mireya Montero as Mirta
 Juan Carlos Caceres as Horacio
Silvia Hernandez as Maruja
Jessica Carrasco as Flavia's Mother
 Ricardo Olea as Eduardo "Lalo" Ramírez
 Rodolfo Pulgar as Anibal Reyes
 Monica Carrasco as Berta
Ignacia Allamand as Rosario
Daniela Lhorente as Mary
Juan Jose Susacassa as Benjamin Valdivia
Samuel Gonzales as Samuel
Daniel Antivilo as Zafrada's Father
Mario Bustos as Maton 2/Arturo
Vilma M.Verdejo as Gladys/Maicol's Mother
Elohim Ramon as Victor
Stephanie Meza as Rosa
Tito Bustamante as Hormazabal
Jessica Vera as Ariel Mother
Daniel De La Vega as Ariel Father
Patricio Ordenes as Javier
Ricardo Aliaga as Maton 1
Nicolas Torres as Matón 2
Rodrigo De Petris as Matón 1
Elisa Vallejos as Miss Rita
Carolina Itveens as Apoderada/Jenny's Mother
Otilio Castro as Flavia Father
Varinia Aguilera as Zafrada Mother
Edaurdo Topelberg as Dueño del Bar/Guardia Disco
Bastian Kinney as Diego
Alejandro Mora as Carabinero 1
Adrian Salgado as Gordo
Angela Lineros as Ponce
Ivan Tobar as Doctor
Claudio Puebla as Dancer 1
Macarena Morande as Inspectora Ministerio de Educación
Alejandra Jara as Lalo Mother
Werne Nuñez as Journalist
Nicolas Cancino as Dancer 2
Hugo Vasquez as Fiscal 1
Macarena Guajardo as Jorquera Secretary
Felipe Rivas as Dancer 3
Jose Luis Aguilera as Funcionario Ministerio de Educación
Claudio Riveros as Fisccal 2
Hector Escudero as Policeman 1
Elvis Fuentes as Locutor Ministerio de Educación
Rodrigo Molina as Policeman 2
Isaac Reveco as Graffitero 1
Carlos Aravena as Graffitero 2
Mario Ossandon as Cabezón Vicuña
Matias Orrega as Rigo
 Carmen Yrene Quispe as Victor Mother
Luis Belleza as Victor Father
Yanina Palacios as Dancer 2
Jose Ignacio Saldivia as Alumno Traficante 1
Carolina Quito as Journalist
Alejandro Ruz as himself

References

2012 Chilean television series debuts
2014 Chilean television series endings
Spanish-language television shows
Televisión Nacional de Chile original programming
Television shows set in Santiago